Farap District   is a district of Lebap Province in Turkmenistan. The administrative center of the district is the town of Farap.

Districts of Turkmenistan
Lebap Region